Tycoon’s cap (also known as acne necrotica miliaris)
is a human disease of the scalp, classified as a mixed alopecia, characterized by minute, itchy pustules within the scalp.

See also
 Skin lesion
 Cicatricial alopecia

References

Further reading
 Freedberg, et al. (2003) Fitzpatrick's Dermatology in General Medicine. (6th ed.) McGraw-Hill. .

Conditions of the skin appendages
Seborrheic dermatitis